Mathieu Léveillé (1709 – September 9, 1743) was an executioner in Canada from 1733 to 1743, originally a Black slave.

References

1709 births
1743 deaths
Martiniquais people
Black Canadian people
Canadian slaves
Canadian executioners
Martiniquais emigrants to Canada